Corpus Inscriptionum Iudaeae/Palaestinae (CIIP) is a corpus of  all ancient inscriptions from the fourth century BC to the seventh century CE discovered in Israel – i.e. “a multi-lingual corpus of the inscriptions from Alexander to Muhammad.” Part 1 of Volume 1 was published in 2010, and Part 2 of Volume 1 in 2012.

Inscriptions are in ten different languages, including  Hebrew, ancient Greek, Latin, Phoenician, Aramaic, Syriac and Nabatean. The seven volume series documents inscriptions from Jerusalem, Caesarea and the northern coastal plain, Jaffa and the southern coastal plain, Ein Gedi and Masada, Galilee.

The researchers partners are Prof. Hannah Cotton, Chair of Classics at the Hebrew University, Prof. Jonathan Price from Tel Aviv University and a team of German researchers led by Professors Werner Eck and Walter Ameling. The project was conceived and planned in 1997, and is mostly funded by the German Research Foundation, which gave the project a million euros.

See also
Archaeology of Israel
Archaeology of Palestine
Corpus Inscriptionum Semiticarum

References

Projects established in 1999
1999 in science
Archaeological corpora
Latin inscriptions
Greek inscriptions
Phoenician inscriptions
Aramaic inscriptions